Tharangam is a 1979 Indian Malayalam film, directed by Baby. The film stars Prem Nazir, Jose Prakash, Aranmula Ponnamma and K. R. Vijaya. The film has a musical score by K. J. Joy.

Cast
Prem Nazir as Madhu
Jose Prakash as Gopalan
Aranmula Ponnamma as Madhu's mother
 Nangasseril Sasi as Madhu's Brother
K. R. Vijaya as Saumini
 P. K. Abraham
Priyamvada
Kanakadurga as Janu
K. P. A. C. Sunny as Varghese
 Prathapachandran as Nanu
 Jagathy Sreekumar as Pappu
 Sadhana
 Lakshmi
 Poornima Bhagyaraj
 John Vargheese
 Thoppil Divakaran
 O. Chandran

Soundtrack
The music was composed by K. J. Joy and the lyrics were written by Chirayinkeezhu Ramakrishnan Nair.

References

External links
 

1979 films
1970s Malayalam-language films
Films directed by Baby (director)